The Ferrari 575M Maranello (Type F133) is a two-seat, two-door, grand tourer manufactured by Italian automobile manufacturer Ferrari. Launched in 2002, it is essentially an updated 550 Maranello featuring minor styling changes from Pininfarina. The 575M was replaced by the 599 GTB in the first half of 2006.

Updates from the 550 included a redesigned interior as well as a number of mechanical improvements, including bigger brake discs, a larger and more powerful engine, improved weight distribution, refined aerodynamics and fluid-dynamics along with an adaptive suspension set-up (the four independent suspensions are also controlled by the gearbox, to minimize pitch throughout the 200-milliseconds shift time). Two six-speed transmissions were available, a conventional manual gearbox and, for the first time on a Ferrari V12, the "F1" automated manual gearbox built by Graziano Trasmissioni. The 575 model number refers to total engine displacement in centiliters, whilst the 'M' is an abbreviation of modificata ("modified").

A total of 2,056 cars were produced, including 246 with manual transmissions.

Specifications

Engine 

Configuration: Longitudinally-mounted Front-engine, rear-wheel-drive layout 65° V12
Aspiration: naturally aspirated
Fuel feed: Bosch Motronic M 5.2 fuel injection
Displacement: 
Bore X stroke: 
Valvetrain: DOHC per bank, 4 valves per cylinder
Lubrication: dry sump
Maximum power:  at 7,250 rpm
Maximum torque:  at 5,250 rpm

Performance 

Maximum speed: 
0 to : 4.2 seconds 
0–400 m: 12.25 seconds
0-1,000 m: 21.9 seconds
All figures for F1 gearbox (+0.05 second for the manual gearbox)

Dimensions 
Front track: 
Rear track: 
Fuel capacity: 105 L (27.7 US gal)

GTC handling package 
The GTC package included Ferrari's fourth Carbon fibre-reinforced Silicon Carbide (C/SiC) composite ceramic brake system, made by Brembo (the first 3 being featured on the Challenge Stradale, F430 and Enzo) as well as a more performance-tuned suspension system, low-restriction exhaust system, and unique 19 inch wheels. The new brakes were based on the company's Formula One technology. They used discs measuring 15.7 inches with six-piston calipers at the front and discs measuring 14.2 inches with four-piston calipers at the rear.

Superamerica 

Introduced in 2005, the Ferrari Superamerica was a convertible version of the 575M Maranello; it featured an electrochromic glass panel roof which rotated 180° at the rear to lie flat over the boot taking 60 seconds for operation. Patented Revocromico the roof incorporates a carbon-fiber structure that is hinged on the single axis with a luggage compartment lid, allowing access to the latter even with an open roof. The roof was manufactured in collaboration with French glass specialist Saint Gobain. With the roof open, the rear window, apart from holding the third stoplight, also acts as a wind deflector. This roof design was previously used on a 2000 Alfa Romeo Vola, designed by Leonardo Fioravanti. The GTC handling package was optional.

Total production amounted to 559 units; this number followed Enzo Ferrari's philosophy that there should always be one fewer car available than what the market demanded; only 43 of those had a manual gearbox.

575 GTZ 
A special 575M was built by Zagato for Japanese Ferrari collector Yoshiyuki Hayashi, and announced at the 2006 Geneva Motor Show. Designed to recall the 250 GT Berlinetta Zagato and commemorate the 50th anniversary of the 250 range, the GTZ was officially endorsed by Ferrari and includes Zagato's trademark double-bubble roofline, the custom coachbuilt bodywork recalling the styling of the Ferrari models of the 1960s and two-tone paint scheme. Six cars were built in total, that were later supplemented by three open variants based on an earlier 550 model. The mechanical components were unchanged.

Motorsports 

In 2003, Ferrari announced the sale of several 575M-based racing cars, known as the 575 GTC (not to be confused with the 575M GTC Handling Package). Following the success of Prodrive built 550 based racing cars, Ferrari wished to offer their own racing car to customers. Introduced at the 2003 Frankfurt Motor Show, the 575 GTC  was a modified 575M specially developed for the FIA GT Championship in collaboration with N Technology. Changes to the car included additional cooling vents on the front in order to cool the larger 6.0-liter V12 engine, an integrated roll-cage, a wider rear track, carbon-fiber body panels, a large fixed rear wing with a Gurney flap, a front splitter, and rear diffuser, a 6-speed Xtrac sequential manual transmission and the use of carbon-fiber racing seats and Lexan windows. The GTC shared the same tubular steel structure as the 575M.

The increase in power was achieved by installing new camshafts and using a Magneti Marelli fuel injection system in place of the Bosch Motronic unit.

Used primarily in the FIA GT Championship, the 575 GTC managed to take a single win in its first season, the Estoril 2003 race, followed by another lone win in 2004. 

The 575 GTC was used as a testbed in the development of the Ferrari XX program.

References

Bibliography

575M Maranello
Grand tourers
Hardtop convertibles
Pininfarina
Rear-wheel-drive vehicles
Cars introduced in 2002